The banded rudderfish (Seriola zonata), also known as the slender amberjack, banded mackerel or shark pilot, is a species of ray-finned fish from the family Carangidae, the jacks and pompanos from the western Atlantic Ocean.

Description
Banded rudderfish are bluish, greenish or brown in colour when adult and do not have any dark vertical bars. The second dorsal fin is around twice the length of the anal fin. The dark lobes of the caudal fin have white tips. The juveniles have six transverse dark bars along their flanks and a dark stripe which runs from the eye to the first dorsal fin. The dorsal fin is dark but there is a indistinct white margin on the second dorsal fin whil the lobe and margin of the anal fin are white. It frequently has an amber stripe which runs from the snout along the flank and there is often another dark strip running from the eye to in front of the first dorsal fin. It has an elongated, fusiform, compressed body with a long, pointed snout.

Distribution
The banded rudderfish is a species of the western Atlantic Ocean where it is found from Nova Scotia to Santos, São Paulo. Its presence in Cuba has yet to be confirmed.

Habitat and biology
It is found over hard substrates in both inshore and offshore waters but it normally inhabits shallower water than its congeners. The juveniles are found in association with floating mats of weed or debris, and have been known to follow sharks and other large fishes. The juveniles have also been recorded in association with jellyfish. The adults feed on fish and crustacea. Spawning takes place throughout the year in offshore waters.

Species description
Seriola zonata was formally described in 1815 as Scomber zonatus by the American physician, naturalist and politician Samuel L. Mitchill (1764–1831) with the type locality stated as New York Bay, New York.

References

Banded rudderfish
Fish described in 1815